Clapham was a borough constituency in South London which returned one Member of Parliament (MP)  to the House of Commons of the UK Parliament.  It was created in time for the 1885 general election then altered in periodic national boundary reviews, principally in 1918, and abolished before the February 1974 general election.  In its early years (until 1918) the seat was officially named Battersea and Clapham Parliamentary Borough: No. 2—The Clapham Division.

Boundaries 
1885–1918: In 1885 the constituency was established as one of two divisions of a new parliamentary borough to be named Battersea and Clapham, in the northern part of the historic county of Surrey.

The Redistribution of Seats Act 1885 provided the constituency, carved out of a corner of East Surrey, was to consist of:

1918–1950: In the redistribution of 1918 the seat was altered to remove half of the wards which constituted Battersea (into a new seat of Battersea South) and to instead consist of the local government wards of Clapham North and Clapham South, together with a part of Balham.  As a matter of strict nomenclature it became a division of Wandsworth 'parliamentary borough'.

Local government bodies
In 1889 the area was among many square miles severed from Surrey to become part of a new county, the County of London. In 1900 the lower rung of local government in London was reorganised. The constituency became part of the Metropolitan Borough of Wandsworth.

In 1965 the area as it then stood for the purposes of local government became almost wholly part of the London Borough of Lambeth and of Greater London.

Members of Parliament

Election results

Elections in the 1880s

Elections in the 1890s

Elections in the 1900s

Elections in the 1910s

General Election 1914–15:

Another General Election was required to take place before the end of 1915. The political parties had been making preparations for an election to take place and by the July 1914, the following candidates had been selected; 
Unionist: Denison Faber
Liberal: Joseph William Molden

Beamish was the nominee of Pemberton Billing's Vigilante Society

 Beamish was supported by, and may have been the nominee, of the National Federation of Discharged and Demobilized Sailors and Soldiers

Elections in the 1920s

Elections in the 1930s

Elections in the 1940s

Elections in the 1950s

Elections in the 1960s

Anti-Common Market

Elections in the 1970s

References 

 British Parliamentary Election Results 1885-1918, compiled and edited by F.W.S. Craig (Macmillan Press 1974)
 Debrett’s Illustrated Heraldic and Biographical House of Commons and the Judicial Bench 1886
 Debrett’s House of Commons and the Judicial Bench 1901
 Debrett’s House of Commons and the Judicial Bench 1918

Parliamentary constituencies in London (historic)
Constituencies of the Parliament of the United Kingdom established in 1885
Constituencies of the Parliament of the United Kingdom disestablished in 1974
Clapham